is a 2021 action role-playing  platform game developed by Adglobe and Live Wire and published by Binary Haze Interactive, featuring a dark fantasy fairy tale.

The story follows Lily, the last surviving priestess in a land devastated by an endless and oppressive rain that drives living things demented and transforms them into undead while granting immortality. Awakening in a church with no recollection of recent events, Lily turns to exploring beyond the safety of the sanctuary to find the source of the rain. Along the way, Lily can summon the spirits of purified undead to protect her.

The title debuted on Steam Early Access on January 21, 2021, and was subsequently released on June 22, 2021 for Windows through Steam and Nintendo Switch. Other console launches followed on June 29, with Xbox One and Xbox Series X and Series S releases, and later with PlayStation 4 release on July 20. It received positive reviews from critics.

Plot
Ender Lilies: Quietus of the Knights begins after the Blight has destroyed the entire kingdom of Land's End and turned all of its inhabitants into the Blighted. The protagonist and player character is Lily, the last surviving descendant of the White Priestesses, who has the ability to cleanse spirits of corruption. Lily is accompanied on her journey by the souls of spirits who have been purified of the Blight.

She is welcomed by the spirit of a knight, who had sworn allegiance to the previous White Priestess, who managed to bind the spirit of the faithful knight to Lily for her protection as she is quite young and defenseless. The knight will help navigate through the scourge kingdom, to find the way and recollect memories together, and, above all, to fight for the young priestess.

Gameplay
Ender Lilies uses 2-dimensional side-scrolling gameplay. The player assumes control of Lily from a third-person perspective. The title is heavy on combat, puzzle-solving, and item collecting in a lost kingdom which the player must explore and uncover the mystery of as the game progresses.

Rather than wielding weaponry herself, Lily purifies the spirits of deceased knights, whose grateful souls join her in her quest; doing the fighting for her. The player starts with the spirit of a swordsman, who can unleash swift sword slashes around a small field, both above and below her. Defeating enemies will gain the player experience points. Special opponents can broaden the player's repertoire by discovering and defeating them, granting newfangled abilities on the basis of their chosen offensive. The combat has the player equipping three different spirits, each of which is unique in their ability. The player can be equipped with two different loadouts and can switch seamlessly between them. Skills are not unlimited, however, and when they run out the player either needs to find a red flower or a place to rest. Players can synergize their skills with the relics that they find scattered over the world. To equip more relics, players will need to find Chains of Sorcery. There are multiple other upgrades that players might find scattered throughout the world, but blights are needed to enhance their skills, which will make them stronger and more potent. The main attack skill, helmed by the Umbral Knight, utilizes ancient souls, which are rare materials uncollectable in the alpha stage. Amulet fragments will increase maximum health points. The player can use the power of praying to restore their health, and can only pray three times before needing to rest. White flowers will restore one prayer. To upgrade the potency of Lily's prayers, players will need to find white priestesses.

There are also three different endings.

Development
On September 10, 2020, Ender Lilies was revealed with a trailer during PAX Online 2020. The exhibitor behind the game, Binary Haze Interactive, was established in June, 2020 by Hiroyuki Kobayashi. Keisuke Okabe will helm the story and game direction for this first entry of the studio's three upcoming titles.

On December 14, 2020, Binary Haze Interactive announced with a trailer that Ender Lilies: Quietus of the Knights will be arriving on Steam Early Access on January 21, 2021. Alongside the launch, the developers have stated that players can also participate in the development of the project through the Steam Discussions, and that they would be listening to the feedback from the community and implementing it into the final release in Summer 2021.

On April 14, 2021, during Nintendo's Indie World showcase, Binary Haze Interactive released a trailer announcing the full release of the game.

The developers considered stylizing the title as ENDER LILIES ~QUIETUS OF THE KNIGHTS~ before settling on ENDER LILIES: Quietus of the Knights, as all caps are very distinct in Japanese in the native character sets.

Release 
Ender Lilies was originally scheduled for release in December 2020, three months after its announcement; however, the game was delayed to Summer 2021.

The first build of the alpha version was released an Early Access on January 21, featuring three of the eight stages in addition to the alpha stages. The final version  launched for Microsoft Windows through Steam and Nintendo Switch on June 22, 2021. It later released for Xbox One with Xbox Series X and Series S on June 29, 2021. A PlayStation 4 port of the game launched on July 20, 2021. The version 1.0 update offers new enemies, bosses and abilities, optimized gameplay balance, and character's maneuver and appearance. It also includes the five new areas to the game and complement the previous three, bringing the storyline to its conclusion.

The soundtrack will come to Spotify and Apple Music, iTunes and Amazon Music, and Steam as a DLC at a later date.

The developers have reportedly been tracking the number of people interested in physical editions of Ender Lilies; although bug fixes, balances, and community feature requests for the digital launch remain as their primary focus.

Music
The music from the game is being composed and performed by Mili, a classical Japanese indie group consisting of Yamato Kasai, Cassie Wei, Yukihito Mitomo, Shoto Yoshida, and Ao Fujimori. The musical band has a host of anime credits including Ghost in the Shell and Goblin Slayer, as well as rhythm games such as Cytus and Deemo. Sound effects are provided by Keiichi Suigiyama, a former Sega producer with credits on franchises like Rez and Skies of Arcadia, completing the game's moving audio section.

Reception

Critical reception 
Ender Lilies: Quietus of the Knights received "generally favorable reviews" according to review website Metacritic. 

It was one of the top selling releases in January 2021 after launching in the second half of the month on Steam. The game gained praise regarding its art design and ambiance, which is stated to bear resemblance to Salt and Sanctuary and titles by Vanillaware, as well as its fighting mechanics that appear to have been inspired by Hollow Knight and Monster Sanctuary. The orchestral, primarily piano-based soundtrack also garnered critical acclaim, with some stating they only listened to the music in the trailer and decided to purchase it. Kazuma Hashimoto of Siliconera declared Ender Lilies "has the potential to be an indie darling. All of the right elements are there, and they come together splendidly." Austin Suther of TechRaptor previewed Ender Lilies: Quietus of the Knights, and concluded it "seems like a very promising game."

Sales 
As of March 2022, the game had sold a total of over 600,000 digital copies worldwide.

Notes

References

External links
 

Early access video games
Single-player video games
Metroidvania games
Dark fantasy video games
2021 video games
Indie video games
Platform games
Video games developed in Japan
Windows games
Nintendo Switch games
Xbox One games
Xbox Series X and Series S games
PlayStation 4 games
PlayStation 5 games